D Centauri is a double star in the southern constellation of Centaurus. The system is faintly visible to the naked eye as a point of light with a combined apparent magnitude of +5.31; the two components are of magnitude 5.78 and 6.98, respectively. It is located at a distance of approximately 610 light years from the Sun based on parallax, and is drifting further away with a radial velocity of ~10 km/s.

The dual nature of this star was announced by C. Rumker in 1837. As of 2015, the pair had an angular separation of  along a position angle of 242°. This orange-hued double has a combined stellar classification of K3III, matching an aging giant star that has exhausted the supply of hydrogen at its core. In 1984, C. J. Corbally found a class of K4IIIab for the primary and K2IIIb for the fainter secondary.

References 

K-type giants
Double stars
Centauri, D
Centaurus (constellation)
Durchmusterung objects
106321
059654
4652